Johannes Pramsohler is a violinist, conductor and record producer, specialised in Historically informed performance, currently based in Paris.

Biography 
Johannes Pramsohler was born 5 April 1980 in Sterzing in the autonomous Italian province of South Tyrol and studied at the Conservatorio Claudio Monteverdi in Bolzano, at the Paris Conservatoire CRR, at the Mozarteum Salzburg, at the Guildhall School of Music and Drama  and at the Royal Academy of Music in London. His main teachers were Georg Egger, Jack Glickman, Rachel Podger and Reinhard Goebel. Already during his studies he played with many of the leading period instrument orchestras such as Concerto Köln, the Orchestra of the Age of Enlightenment, Les Arts Florissants and the Academy of Ancient Music. As part of his career development he was member of the 2007 European Union Baroque Orchestra.

Often invited as guest concertmaster, Johannes Pramsohler led orchestras such as The King's Consort, Le Concert d'Astrée, Concerto Köln, Arte dei Suonatori, the European Union Baroque Orchestra and the Helsinki Baroque Orchestra. He is founding member and artistic director of the London-based International Baroque Players. 2014 saw his soloist debut with the Budapest Festival Orchestra. He regularly performs as a guest of the Berlin Philharmonic with their Early Music ensemble Concerto Melante.

Pramsohler is known for his pioneering work of rediscovering works by neglected composers such as Giovanni Alberto Ristori, Johann Friedrich Meister, Jean-Joseph Cassanéa de Mondonville, Johann Georg Pisendel, Johann Friedrich Fasch and Johann Jakob Kress.

In 2019, Pramsohler teamed up with French video artist Pierre Nouvel and set designer Damien Caille-Perret regarding the creation and development of a multimedia live performance of Johann Sebastian Bach's Musical Offering. In 2020, they launched a live show touring Europe. The performance features three giant rear-projected video screens with five musicians connected to the videos through click tracks using Apple iPad Pros and Soundbrenner Pulse technology. The show debuted at Toblach's Gustav-Mahler-Hall in Italy and also played at Rouen Opera House in France.

Ensemble Diderot 
In 2008 Johannes Pramsohler founded the Ensemble Diderot, a Paris-based ensemble specialising in chamber music from the 17th and 18th centuries. The group released its first album in 2014 on Audax Records and has since released seven more recordings.

Recordings 
In March 2012 Pramsohler released his first solo recording "Pisendel - Violin concertos from Dresden" on the label Raumklang to great critical acclaim. It was nominated for an International Classical Music Award.
In 2013 Pramsohler set up his own record label Audax Records. The first CD was released on October of the same year and was nominated for the Preis der deutschen Schallplattenkritik. The label has since produced 21 albums as well as a Baroque CD for children accompanied by a colouring book. In April 2018 the album "French Sonatas" on which Pramsohler plays with harpsichordist Philippe Grisvard was awarded a Diapason d'Or as well as the Preis der deutschen Schallplattenkritik. In August 2019 also the album "Sonatas for two violins" won the Preis der deutschen Schallplattenkritik. In September 2019 "The Paris Album" was awarded a Diapason d'Or.

Discography
 2012 "Pisendel - Violin concertos from Dresden (International Baroque Players)
 2013 "Johannes Pramsohler" (with Philippe Grisvard, harpsichord)
 2014 "The Dresden Album" (Ensemble Diderot)
 2015 "Bach & Entourage" (with Philippe Grisvard, harpsichord)
 2015 "Montanari - Violin concertos" (Ensemble Diderot)
 2016 "Meister - Il giardino del piacere" (Ensemble Diderot)
 2016 "Mondonville - Trio sonatas op. 2" (Ensemble Diderot)
 2017 "Ristori - Cantatas" (Ensemble Diderot, María Savastano)
 2017 "Bach & Weiss" (with Jadran Duncumb, baroque lute)
 2018 "French Sonatas for Harpsichord and Violin" (with Philippe Grisvard, harpsichord)
 2018 "German Cantatas with Solo Violin" (with Nahuel di Pierro (bass), Andrea Hill (mezzo-soprano), Jorge Navarro Colorado (tenor), Christopher Purves (bass), Ensemble Diderot)
 2018 "Violin concertos from Darmstadt" (with Darmstadt Baroque Soloists)
 2019 "Sonatas for two violins" (with Roldán Bernabé)
 2019 "The Paris Album" (Ensemble Diderot)
 2019 "The London Album" (Ensemble Diderot)
 2019 "Echoes of the Grand Canal" (Ensemble Diderot)
 2020 "Hellendaal 'Cambridge' Sonatas" (with Philippe Grisvard, harpsichord, and Gulrim Choï, cello)
 2020 "Leclair - Trio sonatas op. 4" (Ensemble Diderot)
 2021 Sonatas for three violins (Ensemble Diderot)
2021  The beginning of the violin concerto in France - Leclair(World premiere), Corrette, Aubert, Exaudet (World premiere), Quentin (Ensemble Diderot)

Instrument 
Pramsohler plays a 1713 Pietro Giacomo Rogeri violin made in Brescia and previously owned by Reinhard Goebel and instruments made by Roger Graham Hargrave, Tilman Muthesius and Michael Stauder.

References

External links 
 Official website
 Ensemble Diderot
 International Baroque Players
 Raumklang
 Audax Records

Alumni of the Guildhall School of Music and Drama
Baroque-violin players
Austrian performers of early music
Living people
1980 births
People from Sterzing